K21OM-D, virtual channel 20 (UHF digital channel 21), is a low-power  television station licensed to Lafayette, Louisiana, United States. The station is owned by HC2 Holdings (now INNOVATE Corp). The station's transmitter is located south of Crowley just off La Highway 13. The station launched on February 1, 2020.

Digital channels
The station's signal is multiplexed:

References

External links

Mass media in Lafayette, Louisiana
Television stations in Louisiana
Television channels and stations established in 2017
2017 establishments in Louisiana
Low-power television stations in the United States